The Lac F.X.-Lemieux is located in the unorganized territory of Lac-Croche, in the La Jacques-Cartier Regional County Municipality, in the administrative region of Capitale-Nationale, in the province of Quebec, in Canada.

F.X.-Lemieux is located in the west central part of the Laurentides Wildlife Reserve.

This small valley is served by a few secondary roads serving this area for the needs of forestry, recreational tourism activities.

Forestry is the main economic activity in the sector; recreational tourism, second.

The surface of Lac F.X.-Lemieux is usually frozen from the beginning of December to the end of March, however safe circulation on the ice is generally done from mid-December to mid-March.

Geography 
The main lakes near Lake F.-X.-Lemieux are:

This lake encased between the mountains has an atypical shape resembling a long-tailed beaver. A diamond-shaped peninsula is attached to the north shore and stretches south to the center of the lake.

Lake F.-X.-Lemieux receives the waters:
 from the northeast by the discharge of a set of lakes including Laquerre, Raoul and Fa;
 from the north, by the outlet of Lake Bizette.

From the mouth of Lake F.-X.-Lemieux, located on the south shore in the middle of the lake, the current descends on  first towards the south following the course of the discharge from the lake crossing the Cluse, Verneuil, Oblong and Minime lakes. Then the current veers westwards zigzagging to go to flow on the east bank of the lac aux Rognons which is crossed by the Métabetchouane River. From there, the current generally goes north following on  the course of the Métabetchouane River. From the mouth of the Métabetchouane river on the south shore of Lac Saint-Jean, the current crosses the latter on  towards the northeast, then follows the course of the Saguenay river via La Petite Décharge on  until Tadoussac where it merges with the Saint Lawrence estuary.

Toponymy 
This toponym designation evokes the memory of François-Xavier Lemieux, Deputy Minister of Lands and Forests of Quebec from 1924 to 1936. The road between Quebec (city) and Lac Saint-Jean was opened during his tenure. Born in Quebec in 1877, Lemieux studied at the Jesuit college in Montreal. At the age of 23, at the end of his studies, Lemieux began a career in the Quebec public service. He was first secretary to Adélard Turgeon from 1900 to 1909, then to Jules Allard from 1909 to 1919 and, finally, to Honoré Mercier son until 1924, all three having successively occupied the post of minister des Terres et Forêts.

The toponym "Lac F.X.-Lemieux" was formalized on December 5, 1968, by the Commission de toponymie du Québec.

References

See also 
 La Jacques-Cartier Regional County Municipality
 Lac-Croche, a TNO
 Métabetchouane River
 Saguenay River
 Lac Saint-Jean
 List of lakes of Canada

Lakes of Capitale-Nationale
La Jacques-Cartier Regional County Municipality
Laurentides Wildlife Reserve